Nasrollah Pourjavady is an Iranian philosopher, Sufi scholar and a professor of philosophy at the University of Tehran in Tehran, Iran. He is the founder and former head of the Iran University Press and a permanent member of the Academy of Persian Language and Literature.

Biography
Pourjavady was born in Tehran, Iran. He received his master's degree and doctorate in philosophy from the University of Tehran. Pourjavady held academic positions at various institutions including the University of North Carolina at Chapel Hill, Colgate University, and the Gregorian University in Rome. He was awarded the Alexander von Humboldt Prize for Research Excellence in 2005.

Awards and honors
 Persian Literature Award (2004)
 Alexander von Humboldt Award (2005) 
 Sai'di Sirjani Book Award (2008)

Works
In English
 Kings of Love: The Poetry and History of the Ni'matullahi Sufi Order (1978)
 Sawānih: Inspirations from the World of Pure Spirits (1986)
 The Drunken Universe: An Anthology of Persian Sufi Poetry with Peter Lamborn Wilson (1999)
 The Light of Sakina in Suhrawardi's Philosophy of Illumination (1999)
 Splendour of Iran (3 Volumes, 2001)
 Abu Abd ar-Rahman as-Sulami Collected Works on Early Sufism. 3-Volumes Set. "Majmo'eh Asare Abu Abdurahman Solmi. Set of 3-vols." (ed) (2010)  
In Persian
 Eshrāq va ‛erfān (2001)
 Zaban-e hal: dar erfan adabiyat-e parsi (Tehran, 1385sh/2006)
 Do mojadded (2002)
In French
 La vision  de Dieu en theologie et  mystique musulmane  (1996)

References

Living people
Place of birth missing (living people)
Academic staff of the University of Tehran
20th-century Iranian philosophers
21st-century Iranian philosophers
1943 births
Faculty of Letters and Humanities of the University of Tehran alumni